Journal of Geodynamics is an academic journal published by Elsevier about geodynamics.
Its editor-in-chief is Irina Artemieva;
its 2019 impact factor is 1.855.

References

Elsevier academic journals
Earth and atmospheric sciences journals
Geodynamics